is a Japanese manga by Musawo (also known as ). The series follows a teenage boy who confesses to his long-time crush, despite the fact that he has been assigned a fiancée by the government in an alternate version of modern Japan. It is published by Kodansha, and was serialized in  DeNA's Manga Box app in multiple languages from August 2014 to January 2022. An anime television series adaptation by Liden Films aired from July to September 2017. A live-action film adaptation was released in October 2017.

Plot
In the near future, children who have turned 16 years old are assigned by the government to a partner based on compatibility calculation, in order to increase the country's birth rate. Those who do not marry their assigned partner suffer severe penalties. Yukari Nejima finally confesses his love to schoolmate and long-time crush Misaki Takasaki and discovers she has liked him back. However, when he turns 16, he is assigned another girl, Ririna Sanada. Ririna is not that thrilled about being assigned, and is very willing to let Yukari freely relate with Misaki so she can learn what being in love is really like. The story follows their adventures of the teens as they try to relate with one another while keeping up appearances with the government.

Characters

 The first heroine of the series. Misaki is Yukari's first love who is also in love with him. She has short dark hair styled in a bob. She is beautiful and popular among her schoolmates. She first noticed Yukari in fifth grade when he broke his eraser into two and gave her one half after seeing that she didn't have an eraser since first period. She developed feelings of love for him and his many quirks. She thinks Ririna is a bit naive when it comes to encouraging her and Yukari to continue relating with each other as a couple.

 The second heroine of the series. Ririna is Yukari's arranged partner. She is a beautiful girl with rose blonde hair and big eyes where she resembles a doll. She is aware of Yukari's feelings towards Misaki and agrees to help him out as she wishes to learn what love is like too, and perks up whenever there is the topic of love among Yukari and his friends. When she was younger she was often sick, and when she conversed with girls she was often candid on her thoughts, so she was unable to make friends. Her classmates are envious of her looks and grades, calling her stuck up.

 The main protagonist of the series. Yukari has been in love with his classmate Misaki Takasaki since the fifth grade. Before his 16th birthday, he confesses his feelings to Misaki Takasaki which apparently, turned out to be mutual. He enjoys studying Kofun ancient burial mounds.

Yukari's friend who is surrounded in mystery. He becomes aware of the relationship between Yukari and the girls. He is very popular with the girls, that they had one of them date him for six months. Unlike Yukari, he does not have cooking or cleaning skills.

 A member of the Ministry of Health, Labor, and Welfare, assigned to Yukari and Ririna's marriage case. He has grey hair in the anime.

 A member of the Ministry of Health, Labor, and Welfare, assigned to Yukari and Ririna's marriage case. She has short red hair in the anime and works with Yajima.

Misaki's best friend in middle school who seems to know the reason behind Yukari's sudden partner change.

Media

Manga
Love and Lies was serialized on DeNA's Manga Box app from August 2014 to January 2022. Twelve volumes were released by Kodansha. The French version, licensed by Pika Shonen, was first released on November 2, 2016 and the fifth volume was released on June 28, 2017. The English version has been licensed by Kodansha USA, with the first volume being released on August 22, 2017. An official fanbook was released on July 7, 2017 in Japan.

Volumes

Anime
An anime adaptation by Liden Films and directed by Seiki Takuno aired from July 4 to September 19, 2017. The four-member rock band Frederic performed the opening theme song titled  while three-member unit Roy performed the ending theme song titled "Can't You Say". Sentai Filmworks have licensed the series and streamed the series on Anime Strike and on Hidive outside of the US. MVM Films has licensed the series in the UK.

An original animation DVD was announced on the release of the seventh volume of the manga, with the DVD being bundled with the eighth volume of the manga on November 9, 2018. The release will include two episodes.

Live-action film

A live-action film adaptation premiered in October 2017. Instead of a love triangle between one boy and two girls, it has one girl and two boys. The film stars Aoi Morikawa as Aoi Nisaka, the lead heroine; Takumi Kitamura as Yūto Shiba, Aoi's childhood friend; and Kanta Satō as Sōsuke Takachino, Aoi's arranged partner. The film was directed by Takeshi Furusawa and the screenplay done by Erika Yoshida.

Reception
The manga's compiled book volumes have frequently ranked on Oricon's weekly top 50 comic charts. Volume 2 reached number 16, Volume 3 reached number 6, Volume 4 reached number 5, and Volume 5 reached number 15. Manga Box had reported Love and Lies as their most popular work with 3.5 million viewers, a month after the manga's launch in August 2014.

The series ranked third in the first Next Manga Award in the web manga category.

Works cited
  "Ch." is shortened form for chapter and refers to a chapter number of the Love and Lies manga
  "Ep." is shortened form for episode and refers to an episode number of the Love and Lies anime

Notes

References

External links
  
 

2014 manga
2017 Japanese television series endings
2017 anime television series debuts
Anime series based on manga
Anime Strike
Arranged marriage
Dystopian anime and manga
Japanese webcomics
Kodansha manga
Liden Films
Manga adapted into films
Manga adapted into television series
Marriage in anime and manga
Muse Communication
Romance anime and manga
Sentai Filmworks
Shōnen manga
Webcomics in print